Blues and Vanilla is an album by saxophonist Jack Montrose's Quintet with Red Norvo recorded in 1956 for the RCA Victor label.

Reception

AllMusic rated the album with 3 stars; in his review, Ken Dryden states: "The cool-toned nature of the tenor saxophonist's compositions and arrangements fits in with the so-called West Coast jazz genre, though like many of the musicians labeled as such, Montrose is not a native of the region".

Track listing
All compositions by Jack Montrose except as indicated
 "Concertina da Camera (Blues and Vanilla)" - 18:30
 "Bockhanal" - 3:44
 "Don't Get Around Much Anymore" (Duke Ellington, Bob Russell) - 5:48
 "Bernie's Tune" (Bernie Miller) - 3:19
 "For the Fairest" - 3:36
 "A Dandy Line" - 2:50

Personnel 
Jack Montrose - tenor saxophone, arranger
Red Norvo - vibraphone
Jim Hall - guitar (tracks 2-6)
Max Bennett (tracks 2-6), Walter "Buddy" Clark (track 1) - bass
 Bill Dolney (tracks 2-6), Shelly Manne (track 1) - drums
Joe Maini - alto saxophone (track 1)

References 

1957 albums
RCA Records albums
Jack Montrose albums
Red Norvo albums